Terry Milligan (7 March 1930 – 20 June 2003) was a boxer from Northern Ireland. He was born in Belfast. Terry Milligan had a wife and nine children. He also competed at the 1952 Summer Olympics in Helsinki, where he reached the quarter finals.

References

1930 births
2003 deaths
Boxers from Belfast
Male boxers from Northern Ireland
Boxers at the 1952 Summer Olympics
Olympic boxers of Ireland
Boxers at the 1958 British Empire and Commonwealth Games
Commonwealth Games gold medallists for Northern Ireland
Irish male boxers
Commonwealth Games medallists in boxing
Middleweight boxers
Medallists at the 1958 British Empire and Commonwealth Games